Buckley railway station serves the town of Buckley in Flintshire, Wales. The station is 8½ miles (14 km) north of Wrexham Central on the Borderlands Line.

The station was known as Buckley Junction until 6 May 1974, when it became Buckley. It is the nearest station to Mold, Flintshire.

History

The first railway in the area was the Buckley Railway, a short (5 mile/8 km long) freight branch linking the town with the River Dee at Connah's Quay. The Wrexham, Mold and Connah's Quay Railway arrived in 1866 from a terminus at Wrexham Exchange alongside the GWR's  station and was linked into the Buckley Railway from the outset, eventually taking it over in 1873.

Further construction by the Great Central Railway added links to Chester and to Bidston (the current route north) by 1896. The original Buckley Railway line down to the docks at Connah's Quay remained freight-only throughout its life, finally closing in 1965. That left the current line at the station and ran via the original Buckley (Old) station (closed in 1890, and briefly reopened between 1893–95). Few traces of that route now remain.

The station became an unstaffed halt in 1969 and the substantial two-storey main building was subsequently sold off. It remains standing to this day and is now used as industrial premises.

Facilities
The station has no ticket provision, so these must be purchased in advance or on the train. Train running information can be obtained via CIS screens, timetable poster boards or a payphone on platform 2. Step-free access is available to both platforms; there is no footbridge at this station however, only a foot crossing that must be used with care.

Services
The station is served by an hourly service Monday - Saturday (two-hourly in the evenings & bank holidays) southbound to Wrexham Central and northbound to Bidston for connections to Birkenhead and Liverpool stations via the Merseyrail Wirral Line. On Sundays, there is a train approximately every 90 minutes.

References

Sources

Further reading

External links

Railway stations in Flintshire
DfT Category F2 stations
Former Great Central Railway stations
Railway stations in Great Britain opened in 1890
Railway stations served by Transport for Wales Rail